The UNTV Cup Season 3 was the 2014–2015 season of the public service-based basketball league, the UNTV Cup based in the Philippines. It was opened on November 17, 2014 at the SM Mall of Asia Arena in Pasay. Its final games was held on April 28, 2015 at the Smart Araneta Coliseum in Quezon City, Metro Manila, Philippines.

During the season, the league got its first AnakTV award for being a child-friendly basketball tournament.

Teams 

There are 11 squads who vied for the championship title of the season, including 8 returning teams led by Season 2 champions AFP Cavaliers.

New Teams 
Three new teams were introduced this season.
 Bureau of Fire Protection (BFP) Firefighters
 Government Service Insurance System (GSIS) Furies
 National Housing Authority (Philippines) (NHA) Builders

Defunct Teams 
Two teams backed out of the competition.
 Local Government Units (LGU) Vanguards – played 2 seasons from Season 1 (as part of Congress-LGU Legislators) to Season 2
 Philippine Health Insurance Corporation (PhilHealth) – Your Partner In Health – played 2 seasons from Season 1 to Season 2

Group A

Group B

Elimination round 

The elimination round began on November 17, 2014 at the Mall of Asia Arena in Pasay. The schedule followed a single round robin format in which all teams faced each other once in their respective group, for a total of 4 games per team. After the first elimination round, the bottom teams per group are eliminated, and the top 4 teams per group advance to the second elimination round. After the second elimination round, the bottom 2 teams are eliminated. The top 2 teams get outright semifinals spots, while the remaining 4 teams battle it out on the quarterfinals, with #3 team facing #6, and #4 seed playing against #5.

First round

Group A

Group B

Second round

Playoffs 

There are six teams that qualified for the playoffs. The top two teams, (#1) Malacañang Patriots and (#2) Judiciary Magis, already advance to the semifinals, holding also the twice-to-beat advantage. The remaining four teams will fight for the final two semifinal slots. (#3) Senate Defenders and (#4) AFP Cavaliers will have a twice-to-beat advantage on the quarterfinals against (#6) DOJ Justice Boosters and (#5) PNP Responders, respectively.

Quarterfinals 
The defending champion and #4 team AFP Cavaliers have a twice-to-beat advantage against two-time runner-up and #5 ranked PNP Responders, while first time quarterfinalist and #6 seed DOJ Justice Boosters needs to win two games versus #3 team Senate Defenders.

Both higher seeded teams won their respective series in close. AFP prevents PNP in reaching a third straight finals appearance, 63–59, while Senate beat DOJ in an overtime thriller, 80–78, to advance to the semifinals. The Cavaliers face top team Malacañang Patriots, and the Defenders sets a date with three-time #2 seed Judiciary Magis.

(3) Senate Defenders vs. (6) DOJ Justice Boosters

(4) AFP Cavaliers vs. (5) PNP Responders

Semifinals 

The Malacañang Patriots and Judiciary Magis have a twice-to-beat advantage in the semifinals after being the top 2 teams at the end of the elimination round. Quarterfinals winners AFP Cavaliers and Senate Defenders would need to win twice to enter the finals.

AFP won the first game to extend the series, but Malacañang snatched the second game to eliminate the Cavaliers. On the other match-up, Judiciary beat Senate convincingly, 95–75, to advance to the finals.

(1) Malacañang Patriots vs. (4) AFP Cavaliers

(2) Judiciary Magis vs. (3) Senate Defenders

Battle for Third Place: (3) Senate Defenders vs. (4) AFP Cavaliers 

The battle for third place was between the #3 seed Senate Defenders and reigning champion #4 team AFP Cavaliers, after they lost their semifinals series on separate opponents with a twice-to-win disadvantage. AFP won the game, 98–87, and gets ₱500,000 for their chosen beneficiary as third placer. Despite the loss, Senate received ₱250,000 for charity as fourth placer.

Exhibition Game: Skywalker All Stars vs. UNTV Cup All Stars 

Before the much-awaited championship match between Malacañang Patriots and Judiciary Magis, a special tribute game dubbed the "Skywalker All Star Exhibition Game" was held for the benefit of Samboy Lim and his family. On November 28, 2014, Lim has been rushed to a hospital unconscious after collapsing just minutes after coming out of an exhibition game. He slipped into a coma, and was first admitted to the Intensive Care Unit of the Medical City, before he was later transferred to the intermediate care unit. On January 14, 2015, he slipped out of his comatose state and was brought home where he will continue to receive treatment and therapy. With Daniel Razon's idea, in behalf of the players' name, UNTV Cup donated money to Lim's family in order to help in Samboy's recovery.

The UNTV Cup All Star selection faced former professional basketball players that were previous teammates of Lim.

Skywalker All-Stars 

The Skywalker All-Stars team is composed of former professional basketball players listed below. They wore red jerseys.

 #1 Bong Ravena
 #3 Ed Cordero (UNTV Cup deputy commissioner)
 #5 Ronnie Magsanoc (UNTV Cup color commentator)
 #5 Franz Pumaren
 #6 Atoy Co (UNTV Cup commissioner)
 #6 Jojo Lastimosa
 #6 Noli Locsin
 #8 Allan Caidic
 #10 Freddie Hubalde
 #10 Alvin Teng
 #11 Nelson Asaytono
 #11 Tonichi Yturri
 #12 Virgilio "Bong" dela Cruz
 #14 Johnny Abarrientos
 #14 Hector Calma
 #16 Gil Cortez
 #16 Alvin Patrimonio
 #17 Olsen Racela
 #18 Philip Cezar
 #18 Art Dela Cruz
 #19 Ramon Fernandez
 #25 Freddie Abuda
 #25 Pido Jarencio
 #33 Bogs Adornado
 #44 Jerry Codiñera

UNTV Cup All-Stars 

The UNTV Cup All Star selection is composed of the best UNTV Cup players not playing in the finals, listed below. They wore their white team jerseys.

 Daniel Razon (chairman)
 #2 Jeffrey Quiambao (AFP Cavaliers)
 #3 Peter John Villanueva (MMDA Black Wolves)
 #4 Ollan Omiping (PNP Responders)
 #11 Christopher Tagle (DOJ Justice Boosters)
 #13 Niel "Beng" Tupas III (HOR Solons)
 #14 Jay Mann Misola (PNP Responders)
 #18 Waldemar Tibay (NHA Builders)
 #19 Lloyd Francisco (BFP Firefighters)
 #24 Joether Mallare (MMDA Black Wolves)
 #28 Michael Nuyana (GSIS Furies)
 #87 Reynaldo Agoncillo II (PNP Responders)

Results

UNTV Cup Finals: (1) Malacañang Patriots vs. (2) Judiciary Magis 

The best-of-three finals series was held on April 12 and 28, 2018, at the Ynares Sports Arena in Pasig and Smart Araneta Coliseum in Quezon City, respectively. The championship is between the top two teams, #1 seed Malacañang Patriots and Season 1 champion Judiciary Magis. Both teams won their separate semis matchups with the twice-to-beat advantage. Judiciary won the finals series convincingly against Malacañang, 2–0, to get their second UNTV Cup title and donate ₱2 million to their chosen beneficiary. Malacañang received ₱1 million for their charity as runner-up.

Winners and Beneficiaries 

A total of 5.45 million pesos tax-free was given to the teams' chosen beneficiaries, with the champion team Judiciary Magis taking home a trophy and 2 million pesos given to their chosen beneficiaries. The runner-up team Malacañang Patriots received 1 million pesos for their beneficiary. Five hundred thousand pesos was given to the third place team AFP Cavaliers for their chosen beneficiary. Two hundred fifty thousand pesos was given to the fourth-place finishers Senate Defenders for their chosen charity. The other participating teams got 100 thousand pesos for their beneficiary.

In addition to the usual donations to the team's chosen charities, one million pesos was given to the family of Samboy Lim.

Individual awards

Season awards 

Scoring Champion: Marlon Legaspi (Senate Defenders)
Best in Assists: Eugene Tan (AFP Cavaliers)
Best in Rebounds: Don Camaso (Judiciary Magis)
Best in Blocks: Jay Mann Misola (PNP Responders)
UNTV Cup First Team:
 Don Camaso (Judiciary Magis)
 Ariel Capus (Judiciary Magis)
 Ollan Omiping (PNP Responders)
 Marlon Legaspi (Senate Defenders)
 Eugene Tan (AFP Cavaliers)
Most Valuable Player:
Season MVP: Ariel Capus (Judiciary Magis)
Finals MVP:

Players of the Week 
The following players were named the Players of the Week.

Overall standings

Elimination rounds

Playoffs

UNTV Cup Segments

Heart of a Champion 
The Heart of a Champion segment features UNTV Cup players and their lives off the court as public servants.

Top Plays 
The following segment features the top plays of the week and elimination round.

Player, Analyst and Fan Interviews 
UNTV Cup players, analysts, and fans share their thoughts in interviews.

See also 
 UNTV Cup

References

External links 
 UNTVweb.com

Members Church of God International
2014 Philippine television series debuts
2014 in Philippine sport
2015 in Philippine sport
UNTV Cup
UNTV (Philippines) original programming
2014–15 in Philippine basketball
2014–15 in Philippine basketball leagues